The Sémillante class was a type of 12-pounder, 32-gun frigate of the French Navy, designed by Pierre-Joseph Pénétreau.

 Sémillante 
Builder: Lorient
Ordered: 23 April 1790 (named)
Laid down: December 1790
Launched: 25 November 1791
Completed: May 1792
Fate: Given to Robert Surcouf at Mauritius in September 1808 and armed by him as a privateer, renamed Charles. Captured by the Royal Navy in December 1809 and broken up.

 Insurgente 
Builder: Lorient
Ordered: 3 September 1790
Laid down: 5 November 1791
Launched: 27 April 1793
Completed: June 1793
Fate: Captured by the US Navy off Nevis on 8 February 1799, recommissioned as USS Insurgent, but lost at sea in a hurricane in September 1800.

References
 Winfield, Rif and Roberts, Stephen (2015),French Warships in the Age of Sail 1786-1861: Design, Construction, Careers and Fates (Seaforth Publishing) .

 
Frigate classes